Gauri Shankar Rai (10 June 1924 – 2 May 1991) was a member of the 6th Lok Sabha during 1977-79 representing Ghazipur constituency of Uttar Pradesh. Earlier he had been member of the Uttar Pradesh Legislative Assembly (1957–62) and Legislative Council (1967–76). He served as the Leader of Opposition in Uttar Pradesh Legislative Council.

He was born in a Bhumihar Brahmin family of Karnai village in district Ballia on 10 June 1924 and died on 2 May 1991 at his native village Karnai in Ballia, UP.
Rai had his primary and junior school education in his native village Karnai and neighbouring villages Apayal and Sukhpura. He was admitted in L.D. Meston School in Ballia.

Student Activist and Freedom Fighter: He was arrested on 14 August 1942, for participating in "QUIT INDIA MOVEMENT" of Mahatma Gandhi, as a student of class 9th class. He was president of district youth congress in 1945 and organised many agitations against British govt and local administration, schools and colleges along with his associates such as Chandra Shekhar, Kashi Nath Mishra and Vasudeo Rai. He passed.his intermediate and B. A. From Satish Chandra College BALLIA (Agra University) and BEd from Benares Hindu University, Varanasi. During his student life, he organised an agitation along with his junior friends Chandra Shekhar and Kashi Nath Mishra, against Management of Satish Chandra College for their illegal action against a Learned Principal Dr Sita Ram Chaturvedi and succeeded in compelling management to take back their illegal order and reinstate Dr Chaturvedi. He passed Sahitya Ratna from Hindi Sahitya Sammelan, Allahabad.

Social activist 
He was very active social activist who lead several agitations with his junior friends Sri Chandra Shekhar, ex prime minister and Kashi Nath Mishra, ex minister in UP and was successful. Just after independence in 1947, he led an agitation, organised by student organisations of UP, against enhancement of school fees by UP Govt and was jailed with agitators in Lucknow, but freed after demand was accepted by Govt. He was a teacher in Town College Ballia for some time but left the job due to his preoccupation in Political Activities.

Parliamentary life
He was elected as Member of Legislative Assembly, as a Praja Socialist Party candidate, from Ballia sadar Vidhan Sabha in 1957 and defeated congress candidate. He joined Congress Party in 1964 along with Ashok Mehta when PSP merged itself with Congress Party. Pt. Nehru had declared Socialism as ultimate goal of congress and all socialists to join him and strengthen socialist movement. He was elected to UP Legislative Council, MLC, in 1967 as congress candidate, defeating a communist candidate supported by the then Govt in UP. He was re-elected to UP Council in 1970 and was up to 1976.

He joined JP Movement in 1974 against corruption and misrule of different state governments, e.g. Gujarat and Bihar and also against Government of India. State office of JP Movement was opened at his official residence as MLC in Royal Hotel, Lucknow and his residence became centre of activities.

References 

Indian socialists
People from Ghazipur district
People from Ballia district
1924 births
India MPs 1977–1979
Members of the Uttar Pradesh Legislative Council
Uttar Pradesh MLAs 1957–1962
Lok Sabha members from Uttar Pradesh
1991 deaths
Leaders of the Opposition in the Uttar Pradesh Legislative Council